In the Volume of the Book, released in 1975, was the second studio album from the contemporary Christian music group, 2nd Chapter of Acts. The album title is a reference to Psalm 40:7 ("...in the volume of the book it is written of me").

All songs were written by Annie Herring except "Yahweh" by Jesse Cosio, "Ps. 63" by Matthew Ward and Richard Souther, "Morning Comes When You Call" by Annie Herring and Matthew Ward, and "Hey, Whatcha' Say" by Annie Herring, Matthew Ward and Nelly Ward.

Track listing

Source:

Personnel
 Michael Been – bass guitar
 Jim Gordon – percussion
 Emery Gordy – bass guitar
 Jay Graydon – guitar
 John Guerin – percussion
 Annie Herring – piano, percussion
 David Hungate – bass guitar
 Phil Keaggy – guitar, guitar solos
 David Kemper – drums
 Michael Omartian – piano, percussion, organ, AARVARK
 Larry Rolando – guitar
 Danny Timms – piano
Source:

References

1975 albums
2nd Chapter of Acts albums